Charlie Stimson (born 1 March 1992) is an English footballer, who plays as a forward for Hornchurch.

Career
Stimson played under his father Mark at Gillingham, who then signed him for his new club Barnet. Stimson made his Barnet debut on 25 September 2010 in their 2–2 draw against Morecambe. He left Barnet at the end of the 2010–11 season. After playing for Concord Rangers and Tooting & Mitcham United in the 2011–12 season, he was signed by his father again at Thurrock for the 2012–13 season. After six years with the club, Stimson followed his father to Waltham Abbey in summer 2018 after Thurrock folded, and then to AFC Hornchurch later that year.

Personal life
Stimson's father, Mark is a former professional footballer and current manager, who has managed Charlie at Gillingham, Barnet, Thurrock, Waltham Abbey and AFC Hornchurch. Stimson went to school with former Norwich City defender George Francomb.

Honours
Hornchurch
FA Trophy: 2020–21

References

External links

1992 births
Living people
Gillingham F.C. players
Redbridge F.C. players
Maidstone United F.C. players
Barnet F.C. players
Concord Rangers F.C. players
Tooting & Mitcham United F.C. players
Thurrock F.C. players
Waltham Abbey F.C. players
Hornchurch F.C. players
English Football League players
Isthmian League players
English footballers
Association football forwards